The Beliș is a right tributary of the river Someșul Cald in Romania. Near the village Beliș it discharges into the Lake Fântânele, which is drained by the Someșul Cald.

References

Rivers of Romania
Rivers of Cluj County